Brunei and Malaysia:  Why Sultan Omar Ali Saifuddin Refused to Join the Federation   is a 2013 book written by Isa Bin Ibrahim, a prominent member of the delegation of Sultan Omar Ali Saifuddin of Brunei with Neil Lawson QC, a London lawyer acting as the constitutional adviser on the formation of Malaysia. The book offers an inside perspective on Brunei's determination to retain its territory as an oil-rich self-governing state, contrasted with the British desire that Brunei should become part of the new federation to help counter the regional influence of China.

Description
Tunku Abdul Rahman and most of his senior cabinet ministers, including Tun Abdul Razak, Razali Ismail and Tan Siew Sin, met with the Sultan of Brunei to negotiate conditions including: 
 The number of seats in legislature and parliament
 Control of oil, gas and mineral exploration
 Production, monetary autonomy and Brunei's earlier investments
 Method of taxation
 Authority in education and welfare (sovereign wealth fund)
 Matters of religion and citizenship
 The security of Brunei, and the position of the Sultan
 The status of Brunei within the proposed new federation of Malaysia.

Brunei pulled out of the negotiations before the Malaysia Agreement was signed on 9 July 1963 and subsequently became independent from the United Kingdom on 1 January 1984.

External links 
 Brunei and Malaysia:  Why Sultan Omar Ali Saifuddin Refused to Join the Federation  at Amazon.com

Other reading
 
 
 

History of Brunei
History of Malaysia
Formation of Malaysia